Prinz Adalbert may refer to
SMS Prinz Adalbert (1865), an ironclad ram originally ordered for the Confederate States Navy
SMS Prinz Adalbert (1876), a corvette that served in the German overseas colonial empire
SMS Prinz Adalbert (1901), an armored cruiser sunk by a British submarine in World War I
Prinz Adalbert-class cruiser
SS Prinz Adalbert, a German ocean liner of the Hamburg America Line

See also
Adalbert
Prince Adalbert (disambiguation)
SMS Prinz Adalbert, a list of warships